Joe Ely (born February 9, 1947) is an American singer, songwriter and guitarist, whose music touches on honky-tonk, Texas Country, Tex-Mex and rock and roll.

He has had a genre-crossing career, performing with Bruce Springsteen, Uncle Tupelo, Los Super Seven, The Chieftains and James McMurtry in addition to his early work with The Clash and more recent acoustic tours with Lyle Lovett, John Hiatt, and Guy Clark.

Biography

Early life and career
He was born in Amarillo, Texas, United States. Ely spent his formative years from age 12 in Lubbock, Texas, and attended Monterey High School.

In 1971, with fellow Lubbock musicians Jimmie Dale Gilmore and Butch Hancock, he formed the Flatlanders. According to Ely, "Jimmie [Gilmore] was like a well of country music. He knew everything about it. And Butch was from the folk world. I was kinda the rock & roll guy, and we almost had a triad. We hit it off and started playing a lot together. That opened up a whole new world I had never known existed."

In 1972, the band recorded their first album. Because the band's initial breakup occurred just after their first album was cut, the three musicians have followed individual paths, but have appeared together on each other's albums.  They reformed for 2002's Now Again.

Solo career
Ely's own first, self-titled album, was released in 1977.

The following year, his band played London, where he met punk rock group the Clash. Impressed with each other's performances, the two bands later toured together, including appearances in Ely's hometown of Lubbock, as well as Laredo and Ciudad Juárez in Mexico, across the border from El Paso, Texas. The Clash paid tribute to Joe Ely by including the lyrics "Well there ain't no better blend than Joe Ely and his Texas Men" in the lyrics of their song "If Music Could Talk," which was released in 1980 on the album Sandinista!. Ely sang backing vocals on the Clash single "Should I Stay or Should I Go?". Joe Strummer planned to record with Ely's band, but died before that ever happened—one of Ely's greatest regrets. Another collaboration was with Dutch flamenco guitarist Teye, with whom he recorded Letter to Laredo (1995) and Twistin' in the Wind (1998).

Throughout his career, Ely has issued a steady stream of albums, most on the MCA label, and a live album roughly every ten years.

On May 1, 1982, Joe Ely put on the Third Annual Tornado Jam in Lubbock, Texas to a crowd of 25,000. The Jam included Leon Russell, Joan Jett and The Crickets. The first Tornado Jam was fundraiser to help Lubbock, Texas after the Tornado, thus the name. The second Annual Tornado Jam had a crowd of 35,000.

In the late 1990s, Ely was asked to write songs for the soundtrack of Robert Redford's movie The Horse Whisperer, which led to re-forming The Flatlanders with Gilmore and Hancock. A new album from the trio followed in 2002, with a third in 2004.

In February 2007, Ely released Happy Songs From Rattlesnake Gulch on his own label, Rack 'Em Records. Ely said in an interview with Country Standard Time that he thought it would be easier to release the material on his own label, instead of dealing with a regular record label and their release cycles. A book of Ely's writings, Bonfire of Roadmaps, was published in early 2007 by the University of Texas Press. In early 2008, Ely released a new live album featuring Joel Guzman on accordion recorded at the Cactus Cafe in Austin, Texas in late 2006.

The Flatlanders released their newest album Hills and Valleys on March 31, 2009.

In 2011, Ely released the critically acclaimed album, Satisfied at Last.

In September 2015, Ely released Panhandle Rambler, an album with a reflective west Texas feel. Lonestar Music Magazine says "the title fits the record just right, neatly framing a dozen songs that fit together thematically like a map of both the West Texas landscape and of Ely's epic decades-spanning musical ramble.

Ely spent 2016 as the reigning "Texas State Musician", a one-year designation which he formally accepted in a ceremony at the State Legislature that spring.

In October 2022, he was inducted to the Austin City Limits Hall of Fame
Austin City Limits.

Lawsuit against Universal Music Group
On February 5, 2019, Ely and John Waite filed a class-action lawsuit against Universal Music Group (UMG) claiming the company is violating their right to terminate grants of copyright after 35 years in accordance with copyright law of the United States by ignoring Notices of Termination. May 3, 2019, UMG filed a motion to dismiss the case, stating the Notices of Termination were not valid because the songs were not grants of copyright but works for hire.

Discography

 Joe Ely (1977)
 Honky Tonk Masquerade (1978)
 Down on the Drag (1979)
 Musta Notta Gotta Lotta (1981)
  Hi-Res (1984)
 Lord of the Highway (1987)
 Dig All Night (1988)
 Love and Danger (1992)
 Chippy (1995)
 Letter to Laredo (1995)
 Twistin' in the Wind (1998)
 Live at the Cambridge Folk Festival (1998)
 Streets of Sin (2003)
 Happy Songs from Rattlesnake Gulch (2007)
 Silver City (2007)
 Satisfied At Last (2011)
 B4 84 (2014)
 Panhandle Rambler (2015)
 Full Circle: The Lubbock Tapes (2018)
 Love in the Midst of Mayhem (2020)

See also
The Flatlanders
Los Super Seven
Music of Austin

References

External links 
 Official website
 
 
 
Joe Ely feature and CD reviews at Country Standard Time
Article on Ely's early years, by Johnny Hughes
"Joe Ely Remembers The Clash", ''Austin Chronicle", May 19, 2000

1947 births
Living people
Country musicians from Texas
Progressive country musicians
American country rock singers
American country singer-songwriters
Musicians from Austin, Texas
People from Lubbock, Texas
Musicians from Amarillo, Texas
Singer-songwriters from Texas